Galina Kostenko (8 October 1938 – 3 July 2021) was a Soviet athlete. She competed in the women's high jump at the 1964 Summer Olympics.

References

External links
 

1938 births
2021 deaths
Athletes (track and field) at the 1964 Summer Olympics
Soviet female high jumpers
Olympic athletes of the Soviet Union
Place of birth missing